Lucé may refer to the following places in France:

 Clos Lucé, a mansion in Amboise, in Indre-et-Loire, region of Centre
 La Baroche-sous-Lucé, a commune in the Orne department in the region of Basse-Normandie
 Le Grand-Lucé, a commune in the Sarthe department in the region of Pays-de-la-Loire
 Lucé, Eure-et-Loir, a commune in the Eure-et-Loir department in the region of Centre
 Lucé, Orne, a commune in the Orne department in the region of Basse-Normandie
 Villaines-sous-Lucé, a commune in the Sarthe department in the region of Pays-de-la-Loire

See also 
 Luce (disambiguation)
 Lucia (disambiguation)
 Lúcia
 Lucie (disambiguation)
 Luci
 Lucey (disambiguation)
 Lucy (disambiguation)